Rumes is a municipality of Wallonia located in the province of Hainaut, Belgium. 

On 1 January 2006 the municipality had 5,112 inhabitants. The total area is 23.72 km², giving a population density of 216 inhabitants per km².

The municipality consists of the following districts: La Glanerie, Rumes, and Taintignies.

References

External links
 

Municipalities of Hainaut (province)